Karthavyam may refer to:
 Karthavyam (1982 film), an Indian Malayalam-language film
 Karthavyam (1990 film), an Indian Telugu-language film

See also 
 Kartavya (disambiguation)